The Royal Swedish Naval Materiel Administration (KMF) was the central board of the Swedish Navy in technical and economic terms. It was active between the years 1878 and 1968 when it was disbanded and amalgamated into the Defence Materiel Administration.

History
The Naval Materiel Administration was established on 1 January 1878 after the approval of the Riksdag and the royal decree, by the transformation of the Management of the Naval Affairs (Förvaltningen av sjöärendena) and the merger between Ministry for Naval Affairs' military and technical agencies. The Naval Materiel Administration consisted of three equal units: the Military Department, the Civil Department and the Engineering Department, each with its own chief but with common office and secretariat. The Naval Materiel Administration acted as the agency under the Ministry for Naval Affairs and was the head board for the defense fleet in military, technical and financial matters. The collegial rule lasted until 1881 when the chief of the entire administration  was appointed.  It was until 1920 a government agency under the Ministry for Naval Affairs, then the Ministry of Defence.

In 1968 the Naval Materiel Administration was disbanded and was amalgamated with the Royal Swedish Army Materiel Administration and Royal Swedish Air Force Materiel Administration into the Defence Materiel Administration.

Location
The Naval Materiel Administration was located in Sparreska palatset at Riddarholmen in Stockholm from 1878 to 1916. After many years of renting offices in Stockholm it moved to new premises at Banérgatan 62-64 in Stockholm together with the Royal Swedish Army Materiel Administration and Royal Swedish Air Force Materiel Administration. It remained there until it disbanded in 1968.

Chiefs

Chiefs
Chiefs from 1878 to 1943:
1878–1882: Rear Admiral August G. H. von Feilitzen (head of the military department and as such chairman in plenary)
1882–1883: Captain Berut Oscar Stackelberg (head of the military department and as such chairman in plenary)
1883–1887: Captain (Rear Admiral in 1886) Bernt Oscar Stackelbcrg
1887–1899: Captain (Vice Admiral in 1897) Edvard Svante Knut Peyron
1899–1901: Captain (Rear Admiral in 1900) Louis Palander
1901–1905: Rear Admiral Carl Magnus Ingelman
1905–1910: Rear Admiral (Vice Admiral in 1908) Carl Ollo Olsen
1910–1920: Captain (Vice Admiral in 1917) Gustaf Dyrssen
1920–1925: Captain (Vice Admiral in 1925) Henry Fredrik Lindberg
1925–1933: Rear Admiral (Vice Admiral in 1932), John Christoffer Schneidler
1933–1938: Rear Admiral (Vice Admiral in 1934), Harald Åkermark
1938–1943: Rear Admiral Gunnar Bjurner

Vice Chiefs*

1944–1945: Rear Admiral Sten Erik P:son Wetter
1945–1950: Rear Admiral Stig H:son Ericson
1950–1962: Rear Admiral Gunnar Jedeur-Palmgren
1962–1963: Rear Admiral Sigurd Lagerman

Chiefs
1963–1968: Rear Admiral Sigurd Lagerman

*During the period 1943–1963 the Chief of the Navy was also the Chief of the Royal Swedish Naval Materiel Administration.

See also
Royal Swedish Army Materiel Administration
Royal Swedish Air Force Materiel Administration

References

Further reading

Swedish Navy
Defunct government agencies of Sweden
Government agencies established in 1878
Government agencies disestablished in 1968
1878 establishments in Sweden
1968 disestablishments in Sweden